Shanti Kranti may refer to:

Shanti Kranti (1991 Kannada film)
Shanti Kranti (1991 Telugu film)
Shanti Kranti (1991 Tamil film)

1991 films